Bowie is a city in Prince George's County, Maryland, United States. Per the 2020 census, the population was 58,329. Bowie has grown from a small railroad stop to the largest municipality in Prince George's County, and the fifth most populous city and third largest city by area in the U.S. state of Maryland. In 2014, CNN Money ranked Bowie 28th in its Best Places to Live (in the United States) list.

History

19th century
The city of Bowie owes its existence to the railway. In 1853, Colonel William Duckett Bowie obtained a charter from the Maryland legislature to construct a rail line into Southern Maryland. In 1869, the Baltimore & Potomac Railroad Company began the construction of a railroad from Baltimore to Southern Maryland, terminating in Pope's Creek. The area had already been dotted with small farms and large tobacco plantations in an economy based on agriculture and slavery. In 1870, Ben Plumb, a land speculator and developer, sold building lots around the railroad junction and named the settlement Huntington City. By 1872, the line was completed, together with a "spur" to Washington, D.C. and the entire line through Southern Maryland was completed in 1873.

In 1880, Huntington City was rechartered as Bowie, named for Colonel Bowie's son and business partner Oden Bowie, the former Governor of Maryland and then-president of the Baltimore & Potomac Railroad. In the early days the land was subdivided by developers into more than 500 residential building lots, to create a large town site at a junction of the Baltimore and Potomac's main line to southern Maryland, and the branch line to Washington, D.C.

20th century

By 1902 the Baltimore & Potomac was purchased by the powerful Pennsylvania Railroad. A second railroad entered the community when the Washington, Baltimore and Annapolis Electric Railway electric trolley line commenced service in 1908. The large interurban cars brought rapid transit to the area, with trains running hourly. Bowie area stations included High Bridge, Hillmeade, and the Race Track.

The convergence of the two rail systems induced the Southern Maryland Agricultural Society to build the Bowie Race Track in 1914. The track enabled the Belair Stud to become one of Maryland's premier areas for thoroughbreds. Also in 1914, a teacher-training college, or normal school as it was referred to then, was built for African-Americans, just outside the town. This now has become Bowie State University.  The town of Bowie was incorporated in 1916.

Belair at Bowie
In 1957, the firm of Levitt and Sons acquired the nearby Belair Estate, the original colonial plantation of the Provincial Governor of Maryland, Samuel Ogle, and developed the residential community of Belair at Bowie. Two years later the town of Bowie annexed the Levitt properties and then re-incorporated the now-larger area as a city in 1963. The overwhelming majority of Bowie residents today live in this 1960s Levitt planned community, whose street names are arranged in alliterative sections.  Levitt & Sons had a long history of prohibiting the sale of houses (including resale by owners) to African Americans which led to protests during the Civil Rights Movement in Bowie in 1963.

Belair Estate
The original Belair Estate contains the Belair Mansion (circa 1745), the five-part Georgian plantation house of Governor Samuel Ogle and his son Governor Benjamin Ogle. It was purchased in 1898 by the wealthy banker James T. Woodward who, on his passing in 1910, left it to his nephew, William Woodward, Sr., who became a famous horseman. Restored to reflect its 250-year-old legacy, the Mansion is listed on the National Register of Historic Places.

Belair Stable, on the Estate, was part of the famous Belair Stud, one of the premier racing stables in the 1930s, '40s, and '50s. Owned and operated by William Woodward, Sr. (1876–1953), it closed in 1957 following the death of his son, Billy Woodward. Belair had been the oldest continually operating thoroughbred horse farm in the country.

21st century

It has 72 ball fields, three community centers, an ice arena at Allen Pond Park, the Bowie Town Center, the 800-seat Bowie Center for the Performing Arts, a 150-seat theatrical playhouse, a golf course, and three museums.

Bowie's rail town history is on display via the Huntington Railroad Museum, within the local rail station's restored railroad buildings. In 2006, the city reopened the Bowie Building Association building, a small brick and block structure constructed circa 1930, as a Welcome Center; it originally housed the Bowie Building Association, which helped finance much of the community's early development.

Bowie is home to the Bowie Baysox, a Class AA Eastern League professional baseball team affiliated with the Baltimore Orioles. The Baysox moved to Bowie from Hagerstown in 1993 and began to play at Prince George's Stadium in 1994.  In 2015, the Baysox captured their first Eastern League Championship, defeating the Reading Fightin Phils in five games.

The city operates a senior citizens center and a gymnasium for community programs.

Geography

Bowie is located at  (38.964727, −76.744531).

Adjacent areas
 Glenn Dale (northwest)
 South Laurel (northwest)
 Crofton (northeast)
 Davidsonville (east)
 Queen Anne (southeast)
 Brock Hall (south)
 Kettering (southwest)
 Woodmore (southwest)
 Fairwood (west)

ZIP codes
ZIP codes for mail delivery in Bowie are:
20715, 20716, 20717, 20718, 20719, 20720, 20721

Climate
The climate in this area is characterized by hot, humid summers and generally mild to cool winters.  According to the Köppen Climate Classification system, Bowie has a humid subtropical climate, abbreviated "Cfa" on climate maps.

Demographics

2020 census

Note: the US Census treats Hispanic/Latino as an ethnic category. This table excludes Latinos from the racial categories and assigns them to a separate category. Hispanics/Latinos can be of any race.

2010 census
As of the census of 2010, there were 54,727 people, 19,950 households, and 14,264 families residing in the city.

The ethnic makeup of the city was 41.4% White, 48.7% African American, 0.3% Native American, 4.1% Asian, 0.1% Pacific Islander, 1.9% from other races, and 3.6% from two or more races. Hispanic or Latino of any race were 5.6% of the population.

There were 19,950 households, of which 37.0% had children under the age of 18 living with them, 53.2% were married couples living together, 14.0% had a female householder with no husband present, 4.3% had a male householder with no wife present, and 28.5% were non-families. 23.4% of all households were made up of individuals, and 7.7% had someone living alone who was 65 years of age or older. The average household size was 2.73 and the average family size was 3.23.

The median age in the city was 40.1 years. 24.5% of residents were under the age of 18; 7.6% were between the ages of 18 and 24; 26.2% were from 25 to 44; 30.1% were from 45 to 64; and 11.6% were 65 years of age or older. The gender makeup of the city was 46.9% male and 53.1% female.

According to a 2007 estimate, the median income for a household in the city was $99,105, and the median income for a family was $109,157. Males had a median income of $52,284 versus $40,471 for females. The per capita income for the city was $30,703. About 0.7% of families and 1.6% of the population were below the poverty line, including 1.0% of those under age 18 and 1.8% of those age 65 or over.

 Rank by per capita income in Prince George's County: 7
 Rank by per capita income in Maryland: 65

Government
The City of Bowie operates under a council-manager government as established by the city charter. This means that the mayor and council are responsible for making policy, passing ordinances, voting appropriations, and having overall supervisory authority in the city government.

The U.S. Postal Service operates multiple post offices including Mitchellville, West Bowie, and Bowie/Mitchellville Carrier Annex (adjacent to the city limits).

Law enforcement
The primary law enforcement agency for the city is the Bowie Police Department aided by the Prince George's County Police, the Maryland-National Capital Park Police Department, and the Sheriff's Office as directed by authority.

Prince George's County Police Department District 2 Station in Brock Hall CDP, with a Bowie postal address, serves the community.

Transportation

Bowie is served by several significant highways. The most prominent of these is Interstate 595/U.S. Route 50, the John Hanson Highway, which follows an east–west route through the city. Via I-595/US 50, Bowie has direct connections westward to Washington, D.C. and eastward to Annapolis and the Eastern Shore of Maryland. U.S. Route 301 and Maryland Route 3 skim the eastern edge of the city, providing connections southward to Waldorf and La Plata and northward to Baltimore. Other state highways serving the city include Maryland Route 197, Maryland Route 214, Maryland Route 450 and Maryland Route 564.

It is served by Bowie State station on MARC's Penn Line.

Economy

Largest employers
According to the city's 2018 Comprehensive Annual Financial Report, the largest employers in the city are:

Education

Primary and secondary schools

Public schools
Bowie is within the Prince George's County Public Schools system.

Area residents are zoned to Benjamin Tasker Middle School or Samuel Ogle Middle School, and  Bowie High School. Some Bowie residents also attend Eleanor Roosevelt High School in their STEM program.

Elementary schools in Bowie include Heather Hills, Kenilworth, Northview, Pointer Ridge, Rockledge, Tulip Grove, Whitehall, and Yorktown Elementary Schools. Elementary schools not in Bowie and serving Bowie include High Bridge and Woodmore. Two special education centers are Chapel Forge and C. Elizabeth Reig. A voc/tech school is located at Tall Oaks High School.

Samuel Ogle was previously a junior high school, then an elementary school; around 2005, PGCPS planned to convert it into a middle school.

From 1950 to 1964, during the era of legally-required racial segregation of schools, black students from Bowie attended Fairmont Heights High School, then near Fairmount Heights.

Private schools
Bowie is home to several private schools:

Colleges and universities
Bowie State University, located north of Bowie, has been open since 1865.

Public libraries
Prince George's County Memorial Library System operates two public libraries in Bowie: Bowie Branch and South Bowie Branch.

Notable people

 Richard (Ricky) Arnold, NASA astronaut
 Michael Bray, convicted conspirator in numerous bombings
 Eva Cassidy, singer and songwriter
 Daniel "Jungleman" Cates, professional poker player
 JC Chasez, singer and former member of *NSYNC
 Anthony Cowan Jr., professional basketball player for the Promitheas Patras of the Greek Basket League
 Francis B. Francois, engineer and politician
 Kathie Lee Gifford, television host, singer, songwriter, comedian, and actress
 Benny Williams, college basketball player for the Syracuse Orange
 YungManny, American rapper

Sports

Historic sites
The following is a list of historic sites in the city of Bowie and vicinity identified by the Maryland-National Capital Park and Planning Commission:

Parks
Allen Pond Park
Foxhill Park
Buckingham Park
Somerset Park
Whitemarsh Park
Jericho Park

Sister Cities

In June 2016, Mayor Robinson gave honorary Bowie citizenship to Mayor Luigi Lucchi of Berceto, Italy as part of an International Youth Festival being held there.

References

External links

 
 John Zug surveys at the University of Maryland Libraries. Zug surveyed the land that was to become Bowie

 
1870 establishments in Maryland
Cities in Maryland
Populated places established in 1870
Cities in Prince George's County, Maryland
Washington metropolitan area
Levittown